Ngetbong is a village in Ngardmau, Palau, near the bay Ngeriklreker. The Taoch ra Iwekei river runs through it.

References 

Populated places in Palau